You'll Never See… is the second studio album by Swedish death metal band Grave. It was released in 1992 on Century Media.

Track listing

Personnel
Grave
 Ola Lindgren - Guitars, Backing vocals
 Jörgen Sandström - Vocals, Guitars, Bass
 Jens Paulsson - Drums

Production
 Tomas Skogsberg - Recording, Mixing, Producer
 Claus C. Pilz - Layout
 Axel Hermann - Cover art

References

1992 albums
Grave (band) albums
Century Media Records albums